János Lázok (born 4 October 1984, in Elek) is a Hungarian football player who currently plays for Gyori ETO.

MSV Duisburg
He made his debut against Union Berlin, where he was a titular.

References

External links
 
MLSZ 
HLSZ 

1984 births
Living people
Sportspeople from Békés County
Hungarian footballers
Association football midfielders
Gyulai Termál FC players
Békéscsaba 1912 Előre footballers
Vasas SC players
MTK Budapest FC players
MSV Duisburg players
Paksi FC players
Győri ETO FC players
Nemzeti Bajnokság I players
2. Bundesliga players
Hungarian expatriate footballers
Expatriate footballers in Germany
Hungarian expatriate sportspeople in Germany
Hungary international footballers